Roy Bridge railway station is a railway station serving the village of Roybridge in the Highland region of Scotland. This station is on the West Highland Line, between Tulloch and Spean Bridge, sited  from Craigendoran Junction, near Helensburgh. ScotRail manage the station and operate most services, along with Caledonian Sleeper.

History
This station opened by the West Highland Railway on 7 August 1894. The station was originally a two platform station, with sidings to the north. The station was host to a LNER camping coach from 1935 to 1939. A camping coach was also positioned here by the Scottish Region from 1952 to 1960.

Facilities 

The station is equipped with a waiting room, a bench, a help point and some bike racks. The station is only accessible from a stepped overbridge and thus has no step-free access. As there are no facilities to purchase tickets, passengers must buy one in advance, or from the guard on the train.

Passenger volume 

The statistics cover twelve month periods that start in April.

Services

Sundays see just two trains per day call, as well as the southbound sleeper. The sleeper also carries seated coaches and can thus be used by regular passengers from/to Glasgow (Queen St Low Level) and Edinburgh.

References

External links 

Railway stations in Highland (council area)
Former North British Railway stations
Railway stations in Great Britain opened in 1894
Railway stations served by ScotRail
Railway stations served by Caledonian Sleeper
Railway request stops in Great Britain